Nanne is a surname. Notable people with the surname include:

 Edgar Nanne (born 1952), Guatemalan rower
 Lou Nanne (born 1941), American ice hockey player and general manager
 Marty Nanne (born 1967), American ice hockey player, son of Lou

See also
 Nanne (given name)
 Nannes